Burwood railway station is located on the Alamein line in Victoria, Australia. It serves the eastern Melbourne suburb of Glen Iris, and opened on 30 May 1890 as Hartwell. It was renamed Burwood on 1 August 1909.

History
Burwood station opened on 30 May 1890 and, like the suburb itself, was named after "Burwood House", built by Sir James Frederick Palmer in 1852.

Burwood was on the second section of the Outer Circle line. From May 1897 until July 1898, the station became disused following the closure of the line. However, after a public outcry, the line and the station were reopened, being served by what became known as the Deepdene Dasher, a train consisting of one or two "American-style" carriages hauled by a steam locomotive.

In 1924, the line was electrified to the terminus at Ashburton. On 28 June 1948, the line was extended to Alamein, becoming the present-day Alamein line.

In 1954, the current station was provided, when duplication of the line occurred between Hartwell and Ashburton. In 1955, duplication was provided to Riversdale.

Platforms and services
Burwood has two side platforms. It is served by Alamein line trains.

Platform 1:
  weekday all stations and limited express services to Flinders Street; all stations shuttle services to Camberwell

Platform 2:
  all stations services to Alamein

Transport links
Yarra Trams operates one route via Burwood station:
 : Vermont South – Central Pier (Docklands)

Gallery

References

External links
 
 Melway map at street-directory.com.au

Railway stations in Melbourne
Railway stations in Australia opened in 1890
Railway stations in the City of Boroondara